Apple Certified System Administrator (ACSA) was an Apple Inc. designed certification program to verify an in-depth knowledge of Apple technical architecture. The last ACSA certification was offered for Mac OS X v10.6 and will not be available for Mac OS X v10.7 and later.

An ACSA will have demonstrated the ability to install and configure Mac OS X systems, as well as the ability to design and configure networks; enable, customize, tune, and troubleshoot a wide range of services; and integrate Mac OS X, Mac OS X Server, and other Apple technologies within a multi-platform networked environment.

The ACSA for Mac OS X v10.6 was phased out in June 2012 and it will not be returning for Mac OS X v10.7 and later. The Apple Certified Technical Coordinator v10.7 now replaced the ACSA as Apple's highest certification for systems administrators. Prior to its phase out, it was available for Mac OS X v.10.6 and Mac OS X v10.5. The Mac OS X v10.4 exam was phased out in October 2009, and the Mac OS X v10.3 exam was phased out in December 2005.

For Mac OS X v.10.6 Snow Leopard, the Mac OS X Advanced System Administration exam was eliminated, and replaced with Security & Mobility. The following exams were required:
Mac OS X Server Essentials v10.6 Exam
Mac OS X Directory Services v10.6 Exam
Mac OS X Deployment v10.6 Exam
Mac OS X Security and Mobility v10.6 Exam

For Mac OS X v10.5 Leopard, the ACSA program was revised to require much more knowledge of the Mac OS X Server than 10.4. To achieve the ACSA 10.5, the following exams were required:
Mac OS X Server Essentials v10.5 Exam
Mac OS X Directory Services v10.5 Exam
Mac OS X Deployment v10.5 Exam
Mac OS X Advanced System Admin v10.5 Exam

To achieve the ACSA for Mac OS X v.10.4 Tiger, new candidates took any of the following exams to earn the seven required certification credits:
Mac OS X Deployment v10.4 Exam (9L0-609) -- 2 credits
Xsan Administration v1.1 Exam (9L0-610) -- 3 credits
Directory Services Integration and Administration v10.4 Exam (9L0-611) -- 4 credits
Security Best Practices v10.4 Exam (9L0-612) -- 3 credits
Podcasting and Streaming Internet Media Exam (9L0-613) -- 3 credits
Command Line Setup and Administration v10.4 Exam (9L0-614) -- 3 credits
Network Account Management v10.4 Exam (9L0-615) -- 3 credits
Xsan for Pro Video Technician v10.4 Exam (9L0-932) -- 3 credits

To move on to the Apple Certified Trainer passing the test is only one step. Trainer candidates must not only take the Apple Training course, they must also pass the exam with a 90% or better, and attend a train-the-trainer class.

External links
 Apple Certifications

Apple Inc. services
Information technology qualifications